Anthony Joseph Richardson (born 7 January 1932) is an English former professional footballer who played as a full back.

Career
Born in Southwark, Richardson played for Slough Sports Club and Queens Park Rangers.

References

1932 births
Living people
Footballers from Southwark
English footballers
Association football fullbacks
Queens Park Rangers F.C. players
English Football League players